David Jacobus Bosch (13 December 1929 – 15 April 1992) was an influential missiologist and theologian best known for his book Transforming Mission: Paradigm Shifts in Theology of Mission (1991) — a major work on post-colonial Christian mission. He was a member of the Dutch Reformed Church in South Africa (NGK), also known by its English abbreviation DRC. On Freedom Day, 27 April 2013, he posthumously received the Order of the Baobab from the President of South Africa "for his selfless struggle for equality ... and his dedication to community upliftment. By doing so, he lived the values of non-racialism against the mainstream of his own culture."

Early life
Bosch was born in Kuruman, Cape Province, in the Union of South Africa. He was raised in a nationalist Afrikaner home with little regard for his nation's black citizens and in 1948 when the National Party (South Africa) came to power and began implementing its program of apartheid Bosch welcomed it.

That same year however Bosch began studying and teaching at the University of Pretoria, where he joined the Student Christian Association and was more exposed to black members of the community. This began a lifelong involvement in Christian mission and he was soon questioning the apartheid system.

Missionary career
Sensing a call to be a missionary, Bosch changed to the theological school and graduated with a Bachelor of Divinity and a Master of Arts in languages (Afrikaans, Dutch, German). He then went to Switzerland to study for his doctorate in the field of New Testament at the University of Basel, under Oscar Cullmann, who influenced Bosch to accommodate more ecumenism.

In 1957 Bosch began a decade working as a missionary with the DRC planting churches in the Transkei.

Professor of missiology
In 1967 he took up a position as lecturer in church history and missiology at the DRC's Theological School training black church leaders in the Transkei, where he also built ties with the Roman Catholic and Anglican churches, and began to develop his ministry of writing on mission theory. Bosch wrote about his concerns that the Christian mission to bring good news to black Africans could be confused with colonial and nationalistic motives that entrenched racial divisions.

Isolated from the majority in the DRC who supported apartheid, Bosch left his college in 1971 to become Professor of Missiology at the University of South Africa in Pretoria, which at the time was South Africa's only interracial university. There he edited its journal "Theologia Evangelica" and continued to write.

He was offered the Chair of Mission and Ecumenics at Princeton Theological Seminary in New Jersey, United States but chose to remain working against apartheid from within South Africa and the DRC. In 1979 he helped coordinate a gathering of more than 5000 African Christians from every background, SACLA, as a demonstration of the church as an alternative community embodying the Kingdom of God.

In 1982 he promoted an open letter to the DRC, signed by more than 100 pastors and theologians, publicly condemning apartheid and calling on the church to unite with black churches.

Bosch also bridged evangelical and ecumenical divisions in the global church, participating in both the Lausanne Congress and World Evangelical Alliance events, while also serving the World Council of Churches. He was an active member of the International Association for Mission Studies and the key leader, and inspiration of the South African Missiological Society and founding editor of its journal, Missionalia.

He was fluent in Xhosa, Afrikaans, Dutch, German and English, and lectured widely in Europe, Britain, and North America.

He died in an automobile accident on 15 April 1992 in South Africa at the age of 62. His contribution and influence in mission studies globally was immense.

Missiologist Wilbert R. Shenk, senior Professor at Fuller Theological Seminary, writes the following of Bosch in the foreword to Believing in the Future

Transforming mission 
Bosch wrote more than 150 journal articles and six books, including his magnum opus "Transforming Mission: Paradigm Shifts in Theology of Mission" (1991), which was jointly published by the American Society of Missiology and the Catholic Foreign Mission Society of America's Orbis Books.

The book was praised as groundbreaking by Hans Küng who called it the first book on mission to implement paradigm theory. Lesslie Newbigin nominated it a new standard calling it "a kind of Summa Missiologica" in reference to Thomas Aquinas' foundational thirteenth-century work Summa Theologiae. It was selected as one of the "Fifteen Outstanding Books of 1991" by the International Bulletin of Missionary Research and is available in at least 13 languages.

The book surveys paradigms of mission both in the New Testament (reflecting Bosch's careful use of New Testament criticism to trace how mission dynamics shaped scriptural forms and transformations) and through Church history (highlighting that mission has always been shaped for good or ill by its context). He then explores in detail what he sees as an emerging post-modern or ecumenical missionary paradigm.

Death
Bosch died in a motor accident in 1992, aged 62.

Family life
Bosch was married to Annemie Bosch. She was a significant influence on his life and work, and he often acknowledged her contributions to his writing and teaching. She supported him in his work and helped to create an environment in which he could thrive as a scholar and teacher. She also played an important role in his personal life and was a source of strength and encouragement to him. She continued to be involved in promoting his legacy and the study of missiology. 

He had seven children: Fritz Bosch, Dawie Bosch, Annelise Coetzee, Anton Bosch, Gregory Bosch, Pieter Bosch and Jacques Bosch.

Quotes

Works
 
 
  (published by his wife after his death)

See also
 Missio Dei

References

Sources

Livingston, John Kevin. A Missiology of the Road : The Theology of Mission and Evangelism in the Writings of David J. Bosch. 1992.

Saayman Willem, A. Mission in Bold Humility : David Bosch's Work Considered.  Maryknoll N.Y.: Orbis Books, 1996.

External links
 Special Issue: East Asia Theological Consultation: Asian and Alternative Responses to David Bosch’s Transforming Mission, Mission FOCUS Annual Review, 2003 Volume 11, Supplement.
 Missionalia South African Journal of Missiology
 - 159 quotes from Transforming Mission

1929 births
1992 deaths
People from Ga-Segonyana Local Municipality
Afrikaner people
Members of the Dutch Reformed Church in South Africa (NGK)
South African Calvinist and Reformed theologians
Missiologists

Missional Christianity
Dutch Reformed Church missionaries
Protestant missionaries in South Africa
South African Protestant missionaries
University of Pretoria alumni
University of South Africa alumni
University of Basel alumni
Road incident deaths in South Africa
20th-century Calvinist and Reformed theologians
Order of the Baobab
World Christianity scholars